Franciscus Dousa (Latinized from Frans van der Does; 5 March 1577, Leiden – 11 December 1630, Leiden) was a Dutch classical scholar at Leiden University. He was a younger son of Janus Dousa, a pupil of Justus Lipsius, and a friend of Joseph Justus Scaliger.

He edited the editio princeps of Gaius Lucilius' Satyrarum quae supersunt reliquiae (1597, title page).

Notes

References
 Kamphausen, Philipp (2014). Die Luciliusausgabe des Franciscus Dousa (1597) in ihrem gelehrten Umfeld, Trier: Wissenshaftlicher Verlag Trier.

1577 births
1606 deaths
Dutch classical scholars
Classical scholars of Leiden University
People from Leiden